Life After Hate is a nonprofit organization founded in 2011 by Arno Michaelis. Its stated mission is to help people leave the violent far-right, to connect with humanity, and lead compassionate lives. In January 2017, the Obama administration awarded the group $400,000 as part of a grant from the Department of Homeland Security (DHS) Countering Violent Extremism Task Force. However, DHS advisor Katharine Gorka and other aides of President Donald Trump decided to discontinue the grant in June 2017. A crowdfunding campaign established after the 2017 Charlottesville Unite the Right rally has raised $429,500 to go towards the organization.

History

Life After Hate was founded in 2010 by Christian Picciolini, Angela King, Arno Michaelis, Antony (Tony) McAleer, Frankie Meeink, and Sammy Rangel. The organization was named after a blog entitled, "Life After Hate" by Michaelis.

From the age of 17, Arno Michaelis was deeply involved in the white power movement. He was a founding member of what became the largest racist skinhead organization in the world, a reverend of self-declared Racial Holy War, and lead singer of the race-metal band Centurion, selling over 20,000 CDs. In 2007 Michaelis began writing a reflective memoir and co-founded the online magazine Life After Hate.

Angela King is a co-founder and the Programs Director of Life After Hate. King is an ex-white supremacist who struggled to forgive herself after living years as a neo-Nazi. King was raised in Southern Florida by parents she describes as racist and homophobic. King joined hate groups in her early teens after being bullied throughout school and dealing with tensions at home. She found people welcomed her aggressive and violent tendencies. After eight years of being involved with extremist groups, she was imprisoned. In 1988, she was involved in a robbery of an adult video store. After fleeing to Chicago, Illinois, she was arrested and brought back to Florida to the Federal Detention Center in Miami and sentenced in 1999 to five years. King was transferred from the detention center, to a county jail, on the terms she would divulge information about her former gang members. 

During her sentence, King met a Jamaican woman who was also imprisoned, who changed her mind about white supremacy. King was released in 2001, determined to begin a new life. Today she is committed to help former neo-Nazis and extremists transition from a life of hate.

Christian Picciolini was a co-founder of Life After Hate, and prominent member in the ex-extremist community. Originally a Chicago native, Picciolini grew up in Blue Island, Illinois. Picciolini was first introduced to neo-Nazi groups at the age of 14. The idea of being involved with a big movement appealed to him, and Picciolini later recalled how becoming a skinhead gave him an identity and purpose. Seven years later, at the age of 22, he began to question his beliefs and membership. After his wife and children left him and he began interacting with people in the groups supremacists hated, he decided to change his life. In 2010, he co-founded Life After Hate, with the mission of helping former neo-Nazis like himself.

Programs

ExitUSA
ExitUSA is an organization that specializes in disengagement of individuals who were previously involved in hate groups and reintegrating them back into society as full functioning individuals that are capable of obtaining jobs and building healthy relationships within their communities. ExitUSA continues to use social media to help the ex-radicals deny their previous beliefs. "Asked about 'the Trump effect,' Picciolini said the president's election has emboldened the white supremacist movement. Calls to ExitUSA, a program through Life After Hate, have gone up from two or three per week before the election to 15-20 per week, he said."

Formers Anonymous
Similar to Alcoholics Anonymous, Formers Anonymous is a 12 step self-help program created by Sammy Rangel to help people deal with their violent, racist pasts and move on.

#WeCounterHate
In partnership with Possible, a company based in Seattle, Life After Hate created a social media business to spread messages of love to combat the hateful comments often displayed. The program uses computers that specialize in detecting hateful tweets. Once detected, #WeCounterHate sends a message to the author of the hateful tweet saying that a dollar will be donated to Life After Hate for every retweet that occurs. After the message is sent, many delete the original post and others will not share it.

Notable events

Charlottesville
When Picciolini was asked for his opinion on the 2017 Charlottesville attack, he said it did not surprise him because he was aware that many extremist groups were actively growing underground. He went on say that most members of extremist groups join as an excuse to act out in anger, not because they believe in the group's ideology.

Grant repeal
During the Obama administration, Life After Hate was awarded a $400,000 grant to combat extremist groups. The grant was revoked by the Trump administration due to what Homeland Security explained as a normal review process. A former government official close to the Trump administration, however, reported that the grant was rescinded based on a normal review conducted by the Administration and Homeland Security.

Colin Kaepernick donation
In March 2017, Colin Kaepernick donated $50,000 to Life After Hate for Interventions, travel expenses, social media, analytics software and refurbished laptop computers.

Interviewing Picciolini
In 2017, Goldie Blumenstyk, writing for The Chronicle of Higher Education, interviewed Picciolini. He spoke of his past, living as a white supremacist. He continued by saying that young minds, especially college students, should examine unjust and uncommon situations. Picciolini continued that there is a fine line between seeing something and taking action on what they have seen. Picciolini asserted that it is essential to take everything into perspective before drawing a conclusion.

References

External links
 

Non-profit organizations based in Chicago
Anti-racist organizations in the United States
Left-wing politics in the United States
Anti-fascist organizations in the United States
Organizations established in 2011
2011 establishments in Illinois